Leszek Kudłacik (11 October 1929 – 30 July 1993) was a Polish boxer. He competed in the men's light welterweight event at the 1952 Summer Olympics.

References

External links
 Leszek Kudłacik's olympic profile

1929 births
1993 deaths
Polish male boxers
Olympic boxers of Poland
Boxers at the 1952 Summer Olympics
People from Masovian Voivodeship
Light-welterweight boxers